Zhang Congyuan (born 1948)  is a Taiwanese billionaire and businessman and the founder of Huali Industrial. He is also the richest man in Taiwan.

He was born in a farming family in the Taiwanese countryside in 1948. After graduating from a junior agricultural college, Zhang started working at a women's shoe factory and later decided to open his own sneaker business.  In the 1980s, he established his first factory, and due to a lack of money, he rented land on a pig farm. Soon the business started to boom, and Congyuan opened other branch factories in Taiwan, Guangdong, Vietnam. In 2004 he founded Huali Industrial that as for 2022 has factories in China, Vietnam and Dominicana and produces shoes for such brands as Nike, Ugg, Vans, Puma, and others.

Zhang Congyuan made the 2022 Forbes Billionaires List with an estimated wealth of $11.7 billion and occupied the 163rd position.

References 

1948 births
Living people
Taiwanese billionaires
20th-century Taiwanese businesspeople
21st-century Taiwanese businesspeople